Garrison Station may refer to:

Garrison station (Metro-North), a train station in New York state
Garrison station (RTD), a light rail station in Colorado